The 1990 Senator Windows Welsh Professional Championship was a professional non-ranking snooker tournament, which took place between 12 and 17 February 1990 at the Newport Centre in Newport, Wales.

Darren Morgan won the tournament defeating Doug Mountjoy 9–7 in the final.

Main draw

References

Welsh Professional Championship
Welsh Professional Championship
Welsh Professional Championship
Welsh Professional Championship